New Forest District Council in Hampshire, England is elected every four years.

Political control
Since the foundation of the council in 1973 political control of the council has been held by the following parties:

Leadership
The leaders of the council since 1990 (formally the chair of the policy and resources committee prior to 2001) have been:

Previously New Forest District Council was controlled by the independent group, however the Conservatives entered into talks with several independents and the party later decided to field candidates for the 1973 local election. Subsequently, from 1976 to 1991 the Conservatives had the majority on New Forest District Council, although after the 1991 local election the Conservatives remained the largest party but without a majority, and leadership of the council passed to the Liberal Democrats. This was due to two factors, firstly the unpopularity of the national Conservative Government, and secondly the rise of the Liberal Democrats after the merger of the SDP and Liberal Parties.

In 1995 the Liberal Democrats won overall control of the district council and formed a majority administration, the first political party other than the Conservatives to do so. The result was a concern for local Conservatives who subsequently feared that the new parliamentary constituencies for the New Forest (New Forest East and New Forest West) could be lost to the Liberal Democrats at the upcoming 1997 general election. Nevertheless, both seats were won by the Conservatives despite a crushing national defeat that resulted in a landslide Labour government. Locally the Liberal Democrat administration in the New Forest became very unpopular. Firstly the Council increased taxes by upwards of 40% over four years and secondly the administration introduced car parking charges in council owned car parks despite winning a majority on the promise not to do so.

In a surprising result that came as a shock to many, the Conservatives won a majority of two at New Forest District Council after the 1999 local election. This was especially traumatic for the Liberal Democrats who expected to remain in control of the Council, not least because of the unpopularity of the national Conservative party. At the 2003 election the Conservatives increased their majority slightly, and by 2007 the Conservatives won a solid majority taking 46 of the 60 seats. At the 2011 local election, encouraged by the growing popularity of the Conservatives in the Coalition Government, the Conservatives won 54 of the 60 seats leaving the Liberal Democrats with only 6 representatives. In 2014 the Conservatives lost two councillors after defections to UKIP.

In 2015 the local elections coincided with the general election. Both New Forest parliamentary constituencies were won with almost 60% of the popular vote. The Conservatives won 58 of the district council's 60 seats, with the other two being held by the Liberal Democrats. UKIP, who were expected to make significant gains in the New Forest, were unable to increase their numbers of representatives and lost their only two councillors, both of whom were formerly Conservative defectors.

Following the re-emergence of the Liberal Democrats following the European Union Referendum in 2016, the Liberal Democrats gained 11 seats from the Conservatives in the 2019 local election to take their total to 13. The Conservatives also lost a seat to an independent candidate in Lymington Town to leave the final make-up of New Forest District Council as 46 Conservatives, 13 Lib Dems, and 1 Independent.

New ward boundaries were drawn up in 2020 and will be used for the next local election due in 2023.

Council elections
1973 New Forest District Council election
1976 New Forest District Council election (New ward boundaries)
1979 New Forest District Council election (District boundary changes took place but the number of seats remained the same)
1983 New Forest District Council election
1987 New Forest District Council election
1991 New Forest District Council election
1995 New Forest District Council election (District boundary changes took place but the number of seats remained the same)
1999 New Forest District Council election
2003 New Forest District Council election (New ward boundaries increased the number of seats by 2)
2007 New Forest District Council election
2011 New Forest District Council election (Some new ward boundaries)
2015 New Forest District Council election
2019 New Forest District Council election

District results map

By-election results

1995-1999

1999-2003

2003-2007

2007-2011
The 2007 Brahmshaw, Copythorne Noorth and Minstead By-Election was held after a candidate for the 2007 local election died, postponing the election for that ward.

2011-2015

2015-2019

2019-2023

References

 By-election results

External links
New Forest District Council

 
Council elections in Hampshire
District council elections in England